Boyen Fortress is a former Prussian fortress located in the western part of Giżycko, in Warmian-Masurian Voivodeship, northeastern Poland. It is situated on a narrow isthmus between two large lakes of the Masurian Lake District, Kisajno and Niegocin.

History
The Boyen Fortress, named after Prussian Minister of War Hermann von Boyen, was built between 1844 and 1856 (or 1843 and 1855 according to some sources) by order of King Frederick William IV, with a workforce of about 3,000 soldiers.

During First World War, the fortress supported the German troops during the nearby Battle of Tannenberg in the summer of 1914 with its long range artillery, and with its garrison engaged in feint operations. During Second World War, the fortress was not involved in military operations. It was a site for a field hospital and headquarters of the German military intelligence service (Fremde Heere Ost) under Reinhard Gehlen in 1942–1945. It was abandoned by Germans without fight in 1944.

After the war the fortress became administered by the Polish Army. In 1975, it was declared a monument and opened as a tourist attraction with a small museum on its grounds.

References

Bibliography
 Jurgen Thorwald: Illusion - Soviet soldiers in Hitler's army, OWN Warsaw - Kraków in 1994 (orig. Ger. 1974), 
 Bogdan Vasilenko: Mamry and the surrounding area. Guide, Kętrzyn in 1996,

External links
 Official homepage (English version)

Castles in Warmian-Masurian Voivodeship
Forts in Poland
1856 establishments in Prussia
Buildings and structures completed in 1856
Giżycko County